Abdul Rehman is an Indian politician and is member of the Delhi Legislative Assembly. He is a member of the Aam Aadmi Party and represents Seelampur of Delhi.

Electoral performance

References 
 

Living people
Delhi MLAs 2020–2025
Aam Aadmi Party MLAs from Delhi
Year of birth missing (living people)